Carol Anne Evans, (first name may also be spelt Carole; 29 November 1938 – 14 October 2007) was a Welsh former cricketer who played primarily as a pace bowler. She appeared in 3 Test matches for England between 1968 and 1969. She mainly played domestic cricket for West of England, as well as one match for West Midlands.

References

External links
 
 

1938 births
2007 deaths
Cricketers from Cardiff
Welsh women cricketers
England women Test cricketers
West Midlands women cricketers
West women cricketers